Margaret Gast (2 November 1876 - 13 April 1968) was a German-born American racing cyclist.

At the age of 16 Margaret Gast (original German name "Margareta Nagengast") emigrated from Bavaria in the German Empire to the United States. From 1890 til 1901 she was one of the dominating female racing cyclists in the States. In 1900 she established four endurance records, about 500, 1000, 2000 and 2500 miles. She also rode motor-paced cycling races. Later on, "Little Duchy" as she was called, rode races on motorcycles herself and made stunts.

After her retreat from sport at the beginning of the 1920s Gast learned the profession of physiotherapist, at which she worked until she was very old. In 1931 her studio was destroyed by a fire. She also ran a pub called "The Little Dutchess Inn".

In 1993 Gast was inducted to the United States Bicycling Hall of Fame.

References 
 nagengast.org
 Margaret Gast on usbhof.org
 Riding into a 26th Century – Margaret Gast on xmasepic2010.wordpress.com
 Margaret Gast on lepetitbraquet.free.fr (French)

1876 births
1968 deaths
American female cyclists
Emigrants from the German Empire to the United States